A. M. M. Safiullah (17 August 1947 – 24 April 2021) was a Bangladeshi academic. He served as the 3rd vice-chancellor of Ahsanullah University of Science and Technology and the 10th vice-chancellor of Bangladesh University of Engineering and Technology (BUET).

Education
Safiullah studied in East Pakistan Cadet College (later renamed to Faujderhat Cadet College). He earned his bachelor's and master's in civil engineering from Bangladesh University of Engineering and Technology (BUET) in 1969 and 1977 respectively. He obtained his PhD degree from the University of Strathclyde in 1981 with a Commonwealth Scholarship.

Career
Safiullah joined BUET as a lecturer in civil engineering in 1973 and eventually became a professor in 1984. He held the position of the 10th vice-chancellor of BUET from August 2006 until August 2010. He was among the panel of experts appointed by the Government of Bangladesh for construction of Bangabandhu Bridge, and the panel of experts for construction of the Padma bridge (the largest structure to be built in Bangladesh).

Personal life and death
Safiullah died on 24 April 2021 from COVID-19 complications.

References

1947 births
2021 deaths
Bangladesh University of Engineering and Technology alumni
Alumni of the University of Strathclyde
Academic staff of Bangladesh University of Engineering and Technology
Vice-Chancellors of Bangladesh University of Engineering and Technology
Deaths from the COVID-19 pandemic in Bangladesh
People from Mymensingh District